The World Seniors Championship is an invitational seniors snooker tournament which has been played under different formats. As of 2020 the minimum age is 40, but it was 45 in 2011 and 2012.

History 
The event was first held in 1991 with 16 players aged over 40. It took place at the Trentham Gardens in Stoke-on-Trent with the sponsorship of Matchroom. The final was contested between the two highest ranked players, with Cliff Wilson defeating Eddie Charlton 5–4 to become the inaugural champion. The event was revived in 2010, but the field was reduced to 9 players and was played in Bradford. The event was sponsored by Wyldecrest Park Homes, who remained the sponsor until 2012.

In 2011 event the minimum age for competitors was increased from 40 to 45 years, and it was moved to the East of England Showground in Peterborough. All matches were best of 3 frames, a 30-second shot clock was introduced after ten minutes of play, and the miss rule was altered so  was awarded anywhere on table after the third miss. The field was increased to 16 players, with 12 being invited and four coming through qualifying. In 2012 the event was moved to the Mountbatten Centre in Portsmouth. In 2013 the number of qualifying spots was reduced to two, and the event was sponsored by 888casino.com. Stephen Hendry became eligible to compete at tournament, because he turned 45 during the 2013/2014 season. In the 2014/2015 season the event was moved to the second half of the season, and held at Circus Arena in Blackpool. The minimum age for the event returned to 40 years. All former World Seniors Champions and World Snooker Champions, who registered for the event, were seeded through to Blackpool, and the remaining places were filled through a qualifying event.

In 2017 and 2018 it was held for non-tour players aged 40 or over at the beginning of the year.

From 2019 the tournament was opened back up to players on the main tour who were over 40 but ranked outside the top 64 in the world rankings. The tournament was played at the Crucible Theatre in Sheffield.

Winners

References

 
World championships in snooker
Recurring sporting events established in 1991
1991 establishments in England
Snooker non-ranking competitions
Snooker competitions in England
Senior sports competitions